Richard Bailey Flavell CBE, FRS (born 11 October 1943) is a British molecular biologist, Chief Scientific Officer of Ceres, Inc., and was director of John Innes Centre from 1987 to 1998.

Life
He was educated at the University of Birmingham (BSc, 1964 in Microbiology) and at the University of East Anglia (PhD, 1967 focused on the genetics of acetate utilization in Neurospora crassa). Following that he held a Postdoctoral Fellowship at Stanford University, Stanford, California, 1967-69 where he studied mitochondrial structure and function in Neurospora crassa. He then took up an appointment at the Plant Breeding Institute, Cambridge, England in the Department of Cytogenetics under the leadership of Sir Ralph Riley. In the following years he built up a formidable team of plant molecular geneticists that emerged as one of the strongest in the world. The team was one of the first to clone plant DNA, to produce transgenic plants and to determine the structure of a plant mitochondrial genome.

Works
.Nicholas J. Brewin, Richard B. Flavell, "A cure for anemia in plants?", Nature Biotechnology  15, 222 - 223 (1997)
.Richard B Flavell," A greener Revolution for All". Nature Biotechnology 34 1106-1110, 2016

References

1943 births
Living people
Alumni of the University of Birmingham
Alumni of the University of East Anglia
Academics of the University of East Anglia
Fellows of the Royal Society
Members of the European Molecular Biology Organization
Commanders of the Order of the British Empire
20th-century British biologists
21st-century British biologists